"Down to Earth" is a song co-written and performed by English rock musician Peter Gabriel for the 2008 computer-animated Disney-Pixar film WALL·E. It was released on June 10, 2008, by Walt Disney Records and Real World Records. Composed by Gabriel and Thomas Newman, with lyrics by Gabriel, and featuring the Soweto Gospel Choir, the song is the 37th song on the soundtrack album to WALL·E, in which it is featured over the end credits.

Background
The song saw release as a promotional single for the Pixar animated feature film WALL·E on June 10, 2008. It was released as a digital download single on July 6, 2008.

"As a kid I loved animation, so I'm a huge Pixar fan," Gabriel explained to Mark Blake. "I have seen WALL·E many times as I have young children. It was also great to work with the scorer Thomas Newman... He wrote the best TV theme tune ever: for Six Feet Under."

Reception
Nominated for the Best Original Song award at the Golden Globes, and the Best Original Song award at the 81st Academy Awards, "Down to Earth" lost to Bruce Springsteen's "The Wrestler" from The Wrestler and A. R. Rahman's "Jai Ho" from Slumdog Millionaire, respectively. However, it won the Grammy Award for Best Song Written for Motion Picture, Television or Other Visual Media in 2009.

Chart performance

References

External links
On Pixar Blog

2008 singles
Peter Gabriel songs
Pixar songs
Songs with music by Thomas Newman
Songs written by Peter Gabriel
WALL-E
Environmental songs
Grammy Award for Best Song Written for Visual Media
Walt Disney Records singles
2008 songs
World music songs